The Camping and Caravanning Club is a United Kingdom not-for-profit organisation involved with all aspects of camping based in the United Kingdom. Founded in 1901, the club now represents over half a million members.

History
The Camping and Caravanning Club started in 1901 as the Association of Cycle Campers. Thomas Hiram Holding, one of the founders, is considered by many to be the father of modern camping. He also founded the Bicycle Touring Club in 1878, which became Cyclists' Touring Club, now renamed Cycling UK. Holding wrote The Campers Handbook in 1908, to share his enthusiasm for the great outdoors. His love of camping derived from his experiences as a boy, which dated back to the mid-1800s.

In 1906 the Association of Cycle Campers (now The Camping and Caravanning Club) opened its first camping site, in Weybridge. By that time the organisation had several hundred members. In 1909 the association split into three separate organisations, which joined again in 1910 as the National Camping Club. Two more name changes followed, in 1919 (The Camping Club of Great Britain and Ireland) and in 1983.

In 1967 its membership rose to 100,000 and more than 300,000 by the end of the 20th century. The club now represents over half a million campers in the UK.

Membership from a modern club
The club offers a paid membership service to tent, campervan, caravan and motorhome owners – in fact, the club accepts units of any shape and size, including motorbike campers.

Benefits of being a club member include discounts on its UK and European campsites, money off attractions worldwide and offers on some outdoor retailers.

Structure
The Camping and Caravanning Club is a membership organisation. The club's board of directors, The National Council, are appointed to serve the interests of all club members and manage the club and its policy. The National Council consists of 18 nationally elected councillors, 13 regional councillors, and an honorary treasurer.

Regional elections are held to elect club members onto region councils; these councils oversee the operation of the district associations within their region.

Site classifications 
There are currently more than 1600 campsites owned, managed or certified by the club.

Club sites 
The club has 99 club sites throughout the UK. These are owned, maintained and run by the club.

Camping-in-the-forest sites (CITF) 
The club works alongside the Forestry Commission to run 15 sites in Britain's forests and woodland. The New Forest is home to the majority of these campsites. CITF also have sites in the Forest of Dean, Savernake Forest, Loch Lomond, and Aviemore.

Certificated sites 
The club is recognised as an "exempted organisation" within the terms of the Caravan Sites and Control of Development Act 1960. This means that the UK government allows the club to issue a certificate to land owners, giving them permission to operate a small campsite on their land without specific planning permission. The club has over 1,550 certificated sites open to members.

Independent listed sites 
These sites are not owned or run by the club. They are commercial sites which are promoted by the club under the condition that they meet the standards expected by the club members.

Club-approved campsites in Europe
Opening up a world of choice for campers, the club's travel service promotes over 150 sites in 12 European countries.

Other products and services  
The club also offers insurance, Arrival (a comprehensive breakdown cover undertaken by the RAC) and travel booking in other countries.

Notable presidents

 Julia Bradbury – current president
 David Bellamy – 2001–2013
 Robert Crause Baden-Powell – 1992–2001
 Robert Baden-Powell – 1919–1941
 Robert Falcon Scott – 1909–1912

Annual events 
The club holds events throughout the year, catering to both members and non-members.

National Feast of Lanterns (NFOL) – the club's annual national camping rally – is held in different locations each year.

See also
Caravan and Motorhome Club
Caravan parks

References

Camping in the United Kingdom
Clubs and societies in the United Kingdom
1901 establishments in the United Kingdom
Recreational vehicles